Bibi Khānoom Astarābādi‎ (1858/9 – 1921) was a notable Iranian writer, satirist, and one of the pioneering figures in the women's movement of Iran.

Biography 
Bibi Khatoon Astarabadi was born to the family of Mohammad Baqer Khan Astarabadi, one of the notable men of Astarabad (the present-day Gorgan), and Khadijeh Khanom (خديجه خانم), known as Mollah Bāji (ملاباجی), one of the companions of Shokuh ol-Saltaneh (شکوه السلطنه), wife to Nasser al-Din Shah Qajar. The title Mollah Bāji (see Mollah) is indicative that she must have been educated and in charge of more than the daily household chores of Shah's Court. Indeed, she has been in charge of the education of the children in the court of Nasser al-Din Shah.

At the age of 22, Bibi Khatoon married Musa Khan Vaziri who was a prominent official in the Persian Cossack Brigade. They had seven children, of whom the most distinguished are Colonel Ali-Naqi Vaziri (musicologist, composer, a celebrated player of the tar, and the founder of the Academy of Music of Iran as well of Iran's National Orchestra), Hasan Vaziri (an artistic painter) and the journalist, Khadijeh Afzal Vaziri. Dr Mahlaghā Mallah (دكتر مه لقا ملاح), founder and director of Iran's "Women's Society against Environmental Pollution"  (founded in 1992 to educate children and mothers, as well as state's officials, about dangers of environmental pollution) was the maternal granddaughter of Bibi Khatoon Astarabadi.

Career 
Bibi Khatoon was one of the influential figures in the Iranian constitutional revolution in the late 19th and the early 20th century. She founded the first school for girls (named The School for Girls – دبستان دوشیزگان) in the modern history of Iran and wrote numerous articles in defence of the right of girls to receive universal education. Her articles appeared in such newspapers as Tamaddon (تمدن - Civilization), Habl al-Matin (حبل المتين - Firm Rope) and Majles (مجلس - Parliament). Bibi Khatoon is also known for her book Ma'ayeb al-Rejal (معايب الرجال - Failings of Men), which was a critical response to the pamphlet Ta'deeb al-Nesvan (تاديب النسوان - Edification of Women) by an anonymous author. Ma'ayeb al-Rejal was published in 1895, eleven years before the inauguration of Iran's system of constitutional monarchy in 1906 by the decree of Mozaffar al-Din Shah Qajar. This book is considered by some as the first declaration of women's rights in the recent history of Iran.

The School for Girls (دبستان دوشیزگان)
Founded in 1907 at the residential home of Bibi Khatoon in Tehran, many young girls and their mothers attended The School for Girls, as well as grandmothers. For some of the latter, it was a unique opportunity to obtain formal education. The school was equipped with such facilities (such as desks) as may be taken for granted from the present-day perspective; however, it should be borne in mind that this school provision was part of Bibi Khatoon's residential home and not part of a purpose-built educational facility. This clearly testifies to Bibi Khatoon's wholehearted dedication to the cause of women's education in Iran.

The subjects taught at this school consisted of, in alphabetic order, Arabic language, Arithmetic, Cookery, Geography, History, Law, Music, Persian literature, and Religion, to name but some. It is relevant to point out that in 1936, almost thirty years after the establishment of The School for Girls, 12 women were for the first time admitted to University of Tehran, who entered all faculties.
According to the official data provided by Iran's ministry of higher education, at the turn of the present century some 70% of all students in higher education were women; according to the same data, however, by the same time only 20% of the PhD positions at academic institutions were occupied by women.

The historical site of The School for Girls  survived in its original form for some 22 years following the death of Bibi Khatoon in 1921; in 1943 this site was sold (for 25,000 Tumans) by the extant members of Bibi Khatoon's direct family.

Activities in support of the Constitutional Revolution

On Ta'deeb al-Nesvan (تاديب النسوان - Edification of Women)
According to Ebrahim Nabavi, Ta'deeb al-Nesvan, published in 1288 AH (1895), is a small booklet authored by one of the princes of the Qajar Court, "who must have feared his wife so greatly that he has not had the courage to put his name on it as its author" (in other words, the author of the book is an anonymous Prince). A short summary of the main recommendations in this book, aimed at the "edification" of women, is as follows:
Woman is a being who similar to a child must be educated by a man.
Salvation of woman is conditional upon her absolute obedience to her husband.
Woman must never ask a favour from her husband; it is up to husband to deign to confer favours to his wife.
The duty of woman at home is provision of conditions that are conducive to her husband's tranquility.
The aim of matrimony consists of gratification of the husband's sexual desires.
Woman must at all times be abashed, except in bed.
Woman must not speak during meals.
Woman must, like an ailing individual, walk slowly.
 Etc.

The Vices of Men (Ma'ayib al-Rijal) (1887), a pungent satire, is in fact an answer to an earlier work entitled The Education of Women (Ta'dib al-Niswan (translated into English by E. Powys Mathers in his Eastern Love, vol. iii, London, 1904). The anonymous writer of the latter seems to be a chauvinistic prince, and following the medieval tradition that was not accepted by Shia Muslim clerics.  Bibi Khanum's answers to such absurdities are scathingly indignant. She writes that "genius of the world and unique writer of our times" seems strangely bereft of his senses. "He should have first corrected his own vices and then given us advice. One who has no share of existence, how can he inspire life? ...He regards himself as 'Westernized' and 'civilized,' but in fact, he is not even 'half-civilized.'(سیویلیزه و نیم ویلیزه) Does he not know that Europeans treat their women like flowers, and women freely associate with men?"  The indication that the author was westernised clearly indicates, he must have been from the so-called western influenced intellectuals.  Strangely enough at the time women had very few rights in the west in comparison to Iran and only in some parts of the western world had been able to claim their rights to inheritance.

These two works were published by Hasan Javadi as Two Qajar Essays on Men and Women: Ta'dib al-Nivan and Ma'ayib al-Rijal in Washington in 1992.
رویایی زن و مرد در عصر قاجار در عصر قاجار: دو رساله تادیب النسوان و معایب الرجال

Response of Bibi Khatoon: Ma'ayeb al-Rejal (معايب الرجال - Failings of Men)
According to Ebrahim Nabavi, Ma'ayeb al-Rejal consists of two main parts, in one of which Bibi Khatoon responds directly to the contents of Ta'deeb al-Nesvan, and in the other she describes the conditions prevailing in the men's social gatherings of her time. True to her usual style of writing, Bibi Khatoon's tone in this book is derisive. [To be extended at a later occasion.]

See also
Forough Azarakhshi
Farrokhroo Pārsā
Intellectual movements in Iran
Iranian women
One Million Signatures
Persian Constitutional Revolution
Persian women's movement

Notes and references

Further reading
 Afsaneh Najmabadi, Women with Mustaches and Men without Beards: Gender and Sexual Anxieties of Iranian Modernity (University of California Press, Berkeley, 2005). 
 Afsaneh Najmabadi, editor, Bibi Khanum Astarabadi's Ma'ayib al-Rijal: Vices of Men (Midland Printers, Chicago, 1992).
 Hasan Javadi, Manijeh Marashi, and Simin Shekrloo, editors, Ta'dib al-Nisvan va Ma'ayib al-Rijal [Disciplining of Women and Vices of Men] (Jahan Books, Maryland, 1992).
 The education of women & the vices of men: two Qajar tracts, transl. and introd. by Hasan Javadi and Willem Floor (Syracuse Univ. Press, Syracuse NY, 2010). 
 Jasmin Khosravie, Die Sünden der Männer – Konzepte von Weiblichkeit im Spiegel der Lebenswelt von Bibi Khanum Astarabadi (st. 1921), in: S. Conermann & S. von Hees (ed.): Islamwissenschaft als Kulturwissenschaft: Historische Anthropologie. Ansätze und Möglichkeiten (pp. 235–262), (EB-Publishers, Hamburg 2007).

External links

 Ebrahim Nabavi, Bibi Khanom and the Unknown Prince (بی بی خانم و شاهزاده گمنام), BBC Persian, Wednesday 26 July 2006.
 "The School for Girls" (مدرسه دوشيزگان) at Deutsche Welle. A programme celebrating the 100th anniversary of the Constitutional Revolution of Iran with an interview with Dr Mah-Laghā Mallah (دكتر مه لقا ملاح), maternal granddaughter of Bibi Khatoon Astarabadi, 11 August 2006. At the time of interview, Dr Mallah was 90 years old.
 "Bibi Khanom Astarabadi (Gorgani)", a short biography of Bibi Khatoon Astarabadi (in Persian), containing some transcribed material from the above-mentioned interview with Deutsche Welle of Dr Mah-Laghā Mallah. shomaliha.com.

Iranian satirists
Iranian essayists
1858 births
1921 deaths
Iranian women's rights activists
Iranian democracy activists
People of the Persian Constitutional Revolution
Iranian women essayists
Women satirists
19th-century Iranian women writers
20th-century Iranian women writers
19th-century Iranian writers
20th-century Iranian writers
People from Gorgan
People of Qajar Iran